The Achton Friis Islands are a group of uninhabited islands in the Greenland Sea, Greenland.

They were named by the Denmark expedition in honor of illustrator Achton Friis, one of the expedition members.

Geography
The Achton Friis Islands lie northeast of Jokel Bay, northeastern Greenland. They are located east of the terminus of the Zachariae Isstrom glacier, south of Cape Drygalsky, off the southeastern coast of Lambert Land and north of Schnauder Island ; to the southwest of the Norske Islands and northwest of the Franske Islands. 

See also
List of islands of Greenland

References

Uninhabited islands of Greenland